The men's 800 metres was the middle of the seven men's track races in the Athletics at the 1964 Summer Olympics program in Tokyo. 47 athletes from 32 nations competed. The maximum number of athletes per nation had been set at 3 since the 1930 Olympic Congress. The first round was held on 14 October, with the semifinals on 15 October and the final on 16 October. The event was won by Peter Snell of New Zealand, successfully defending his 1960 gold medal (the third man to do so), and completing the first half of his 800 metres/1500 metres double. Bill Crothers of Canada took silver, the first 800 metres medal for that nation since 1936 and matching Canada's best-ever result in the event (silver in 1932). Wilson Kiprugut's bronze was the first medal by Kenya in any event; Kenya would become a frequent fixture on the men's 800 metres podium.

Summary

The runners used a crouch start without blocks and a single turn stagger start (breaking after the first turn).  Returning to the final from four years earlier were defending champion Peter Snell and bronze medalist George Kerr.  While Snell started strongly, he found himself in third place at the break, led by aggressive front-running by Wilson Kiprugut.  As others moved forward, Snell found himself boxed along the rail, so as the runners came onto the home stretch he had to slow to come out the back of the box, then as the bell approached, he glided along the outside to catch up to Kiprugut and Kerr in the lead.  With free running room, Snell kept going, taking the lead on the penultimate turn.  After establishing a three-metre lead, he held his position, even extending it a little to take the repeat gold.  Down the backstretch, Bill Crothers made his way around Kiprugut while Kerr was trying to chase down Snell.  Crothers came off the final turn with more speed, passing Kerr on the home stretch.  Kerr began to struggle.  Snell was too far ahead for Crothers to catch, but Kiprugut closed down on Kerr, passing him and sealing the bronze medal with a dip at the finish.

Snell became the third to defend his 800-metre title after Douglas Lowe and Mal Whitfield.  The feat would not be accomplished again for 52 years until David Rudisha repeated in 2016.  Kiprugut won Kenya's first ever Olympic medal, unleashing a floodgate of national dominance in distance running events, particularly the 3000 meters steeplechase in subsequent Olympics.

Background

This was the 15th appearance of the event, which is one of 12 athletics events to have been held at every Summer Olympics. Three finalists from 1960 returned: gold medalist Peter Snell of New Zealand, bronze medalist George Kerr of Jamaica, and sixth-place finisher Manfred Matuschewski of the United Team of Germany. Snell had broken the 800 metres world record as well as the one-mile world record, and was a favorite to repeat.

Chad, Colombia, Hong Kong, Iran, Malaysia, Mongolia, and Tanzania appeared in the event for the first time. Great Britain and the United States each made their 14th appearance, tied for the most among all nations.

Competition format

After one Games of a four-round format in 1960, the competition returned to the three-round format used in most Games since 1912 (other than 1960, the only other deviation was in 1936 when there were only two rounds due to a small number of entrants). The final, which had been 9 men from 1920 to 1952, 8 in 1956, and only 6 in 1960, was back up to 8 men. The 1964 competition introduced the "fastest loser" system, used only in the semifinals at this edition. Previously, advancement depended solely on the runners' place in their heat. The 1964 competition added advancement places to the fastest runners across the heats in the semifinals who did not advance based on place.

There were six first-round heats, each with 7 or 8 athletes; the top four runners in each heat advanced to the semifinals. There were three semifinals with 8 athletes each; the top two runners in each semifinal, and the next two fastest overall, advanced to the eight-man final.

Records

These were the standing world and Olympic records (in minutes) prior to the 1948 Summer Olympics.

In the second semifinal, George Kerr and Wilson Kiprugut each finished at 1:46.1 to set a new, though short-lived, Olympic record. The final saw four runners break that new record, with Peter Snell's gold-medal winning 1:45.1 the new record afterward.

Schedule

All times are Japan Standard Time (UTC+9)

Results

First round

The top four runners in each of the 6 heats advanced.

Heat 1

Heat 2

Heat 3

Heat 4

Heat 5

Heat 6

Semifinals

The top two runners in each of the three semifinals qualified for the final, as did the two runners with the fastest times from among the 3rd-8th spots across all of the semifinals.

Semifinal 1

Semifinal 2

Kerr and Kiprugut both crossed the finish line in 1:46.1, breaking the old Olympic record of 1:46.3.

Semifinal 3

Final

No fewer than four runners broke the Olympic record that had been set in the semifinals, including the two runners that had set it.  Despite the record performances by the other three runners, defending Olympic champion and world record holder Peter Snell still won by half a second to take the gold medal and set the new Olympic record at 1:45.1.

References

Athletics at the 1964 Summer Olympics
800 metres at the Olympics
Men's events at the 1964 Summer Olympics